Msisi may refer to:

Msisi (Dodoma Rural region), a Tanzanian ward in Dodoma Rural district
Msisi (Singida Rural ward), a Tanzanian ward in Singida Rural district